United Nations Security Council Resolution 2650 was passed by a unanimous vote on 31 August 2022, which extended through 31 August 2023 the United Nations Interim Force in Lebanon. This was done so at the request of the third Cabinet of Najib Mikati as the current Government of Lebanon.

See also 

 List of United Nations Security Council Resolutions 2601 to 2700 (2021–present)

References

External links 

 Resolution

 2650
 2650
2022 in Lebanon
 2650